The 2022 Hungarian Grand Prix (officially known as the Formula 1 Aramco Magyar Nagydíj 2022) was a Formula One motor race held on 31 July 2022 at the Hungaroring in Mogyoród, Hungary over a distance of 70 laps. The race was the thirty-seventh Hungarian Grand Prix to be held as part of the Formula One World Championship.

The race was won by Max Verstappen from the 10th position on the starting grid, while Mercedes drivers Lewis Hamilton and George Russell finished second and third respectively, with Russell having started from pole position. Ferrari drivers Carlos Sainz Jr. and Charles Leclerc both started strongly but could not hold up until the end of the race, finishing fourth and sixth respectively. Championship leader Verstappen extended his lead over Leclerc to 80 points.

Background
The event was held across the weekend of the 29–31 July. It was the thirteenth round of the 2022 Formula One World Championship.

Championship standings before the race
Max Verstappen led the Drivers' Championship by 63 points from Charles Leclerc, with Sergio Pérez third, a further 7 points behind. Red Bull Racing led the Constructors' Championship, leading Ferrari by 82 points and Mercedes by 126 points.

Entrants

The drivers and teams were the same as the season entry list with no additional stand-in drivers for the race. Robert Kubica drove for Alfa Romeo in place of Valtteri Bottas during the first practice session.

Tyre choices

Tyre supplier Pirelli brought the C2, C3, and C4 tyre compounds (designated hard, medium, and soft, respectively) for teams to use at the event.

Practice 
The first practice session took place at 14:00 local time (UTC+02:00) on 29 July 2022. Carlos Sainz Jr. was quickest, with Max Verstappen and Charles Leclerc in second and third respectively. The second practice session took part on the same day at 17:00 local time. Leclerc was quickest, with Lando Norris and Sainz in second and third respectively. The third practice session started at 13:00 on 30 July 2022. Sebastian Vettel crashed out at turn 10, causing a red flag. Once the session restarted, Nicholas Latifi went fastest, with Leclerc and Alexander Albon in second and third respectively.

Qualifying 
Qualifying took place at 16:00 local time (UTC+02:00) on 30 July 2022, and lasted for one hour. The qualifying session was held in dry but overcast conditions throughout.

The first part of qualifying (Q1) saw the bottom five drivers eliminated from the rest of the session. Nicholas Latifi was knocked out in Q1 and qualified 20th and last having made a mistake at the final corner on his final attempt in Q1. Yuki Tsunoda, Alexander Albon, Sebastian Vettel, Pierre Gasly and Latifi were eliminated.

The second part of qualifying (Q2) saw the bottom five drivers eliminated from the rest of the session. Sergio Pérez had a lap time, that was initially deleted for a track limits infringement, before being reinstated after further inspection, with the FIA deeming that he did not violate track limits.  Pérez, Zhou Guanyu, Magnussen, Lance Stroll and Mick Schumacher were eliminated. Pérez blamed Magnussen for blocking his final attempt, arguing that he would have progressed had Magnussen not blocked him.

The third part of qualifying (Q3) was a ten-car shoot-out for pole position. After everyone's initial runs, Carlos Sainz Jr. was on provisional pole, with George Russell and Charles Leclerc in second and third. Championship leader, Max Verstappen, locked up on his lap, so he only managed to be seventh. All cars then attempted another, final, lap to challenge for pole position, although Verstappen had power unit problems, which meant he was unable to set a representative lap; he qualified tenth. Russell, competing for Mercedes, took his maiden pole position of his Formula One career, he had previously twice qualified second. Ferrari drivers Sainz and Leclerc were second and third respectively, with Lando Norris in fourth and Esteban Ocon in fifth. Russell's teammate, Lewis Hamilton, had a DRS issue, coting his time and resulting in him qualifying seventh, eight-tenths from pole.

Post qualifying
Following the session Verstappen, Pérez and Gasly were critical of the stewards' handling of track limit violations. Williams were fined  after they were found to have used a set of soft tyres in Q1 on the car of Albon which the team had already electronically returned—which is illegal under the sporting regulations. The stewards chose not to impose a sporting penalty after accepting that no unfair sporting advantage had been gained by using these tyres and that the rule breach was purely an administrative error.

Qualifying classification 

  – Pierre Gasly qualified 19th, but he was required to start the race from the back of the grid for exceeding his quota of power unit elements. The new power unit elements were changed while the car was under parc fermé without the permission of the technical delegate. He was then required to start the race from the pit lane.

Race 
The race started at 15:00 local time (UTC+02:00) on 31 July 2022, and lasted for 70 laps. George Russell kept first place into turn one, from Carlos Sainz Jr. and Charles Leclerc. Further back, Esteban Ocon defended from his Alpine teammate, Fernando Alonso, who later complained about Ocon's defence on the team radio. Contact between Lance Stroll and Alexander Albon meant the latter had to pit to replace a damaged front wing. Kevin Magnussen was forced to pit after he was shown the black and orange flag, due to damage to the right side of his front wing. The virtual safety car (VSC) was called out to pick up debris caused by the collisions. Once the VSC ended, Russell immediately pulled a 2.5 second gap to Sainz. With the help of DRS, Max Verstappen made his way through the grid, overtaking his teammate, both Alpine cars and Lando Norris, before pitting and undercutting Lewis Hamilton. Russell and Sainz both had slow pit stops, which allowed Leclerc to overcut Sainz and close up to Russell, later overtaking him into turn one. Verstappen then closed the gap to Russell and Sainz, as Leclerc extended his lead at the front.

Verstappen pitted again, with Russell and Leclerc making reactionary pitstops. Verstappen undercut Russell, while Leclerc pit onto the slower hard tyres. Verstappen overtook Leclerc into turn one and proceeded to give the lead back after spinning at turn 13 on lap 41. He re-overtook Leclerc. Sainz and Hamilton pitted onto the soft compound tyres, which elevated Verstappen into first. Russell overtook Leclerc, which prompted him to pit and change onto the soft tyres. Hamilton chased down Sainz and Russell, overtaking them both before the end of the race, promoting himself into second.

Yuki Tsunoda spun, causing a brief yellow flag. Stroll attempted to overtake Daniel Ricciardo, Ricciardo locked up and hit Stroll, causing the latter to spin. Neither driver received damage and both carried on whilst Ricciardo was given a five-second time penalty for causing the collision. Valtteri Bottas had a power unit issue on lap 66, leading to his retirement and the second VSC of the race. As the VSC ended, the rain replaced the light drizzle that had been present throughout the race and DRS was disabled on the last lap; all drivers managed to reach the finish without changing onto wet weather tyres.

Verstappen won the race, Hamilton (who set the fastest lap on lap 57) and Russell finishing second and third respectively, leading to Mercedes' second consecutive double podium. Sainz finished fourth. Sergio Pérez was fifth, and Leclerc sixth. Norris finished seventh, ahead of the Alpines of Alonso and Ocon who finished eighth and ninth respectively. Sebastian Vettel finished tenth and was the last of the points finishers.

Post race 
Ferrari was criticised by media for their decision to place the hard tyres onto Leclerc's car, despite the obvious pace loss shown by the Alpine drivers earlier in the race.  Former Formula One driver, Anthony Davidson, said that "improvement[s] need to be made" in reference to Ferrari's strategy, while Sky Sports pundit Ted Kravitz claimed the strategy was "baffling". Mattia Binotto defended his team, attributing the finishing position to the lack of pace rather than the tyres.  Leclerc later admitted the strategy was a "disaster".  Leclerc's teammate Carlos Sainz agreed with team principal's defence, noting that he himself was unable to finish on the podium despite using the strategy most pundits state should have been used for Leclerc. Reporter Alex Mitton called the Ferrari strategy team the "worst", while commentator Alex Brundle exclaimed the hard tyres made "no sense".

Race classification 

Notes
  – Includes one point for fastest lap.
  – Daniel Ricciardo finished 13th, but he received a five-second time penalty for causing a collision with Lance Stroll.
  – Valtteri Bottas was classified as he completed more than 90% of the race distance.

Championship standings after the race

Drivers' Championship standings

Constructors' Championship standings

 Note: Only the top five positions are included for both sets of standings.

See also
 2022 Budapest Formula 2 round
 2022 Budapest Formula 3 round

References

External links

Hungarian
2022
Hungarian Grand Prix
Hungarian Grand Prix